The Ville Emard Juveniles was a junior football team from Ville Emard, Quebec, and played in the Quebec Senior Football League, Quebec Juvenile Football League and the Quebec Junior Football League in the 1950s and 1960s.

References

Canadian football teams in Montreal
Defunct Canadian football teams
Former Canadian Junior Football League teams
Le Sud-Ouest